Fayette is an unincorporated community located in the town of Fayette, Lafayette County, Wisconsin, United States. Deriving its name from Lafayette County, the post office was established in August 1849 with Martin W. Anderson as the first postmaster.

Notes

Unincorporated communities in Lafayette County, Wisconsin
Unincorporated communities in Wisconsin